The Church of the All Saints' in Castleford, West Yorkshire, England is an active Anglican parish church in the archdeaconry of Leeds and the Diocese of Leeds. The church is Grade II listed.  All Saints is one of three Anglican churches in the town; the other two being All Saints at Hightown and St Paul the Apostle.

History
The Church was built to a design by H. F. Bacon and was completed in 1866.

Architectural style

The church is built of Hammer-dressed sandstone with a slate roof.  The five-bay nave has both north and south aisles with a crossing tower, a south gabled porch and north and south transepts.  The buttressed north aisle has a weathered plinth, two-centred arched window with two cusped lights with hood moulds with figured stops.  The crossing tower has two stages and corner pilasters and a white clock face with hood mould and two recessed louvred belfry windows with set in shafts at each side.

See also
Listed buildings in Castleford

References

External links

Castleford Team Parish

Churches in Castleford, West Yorkshire
Listed buildings in Castleford, West Yorkshire
Anglican Diocese of Leeds
Church of England church buildings in West Yorkshire
Grade II listed churches in West Yorkshire